Warnbro is a southern outer suburb of Perth, the capital of Western Australia, located on Warnbro Sound within the City of Rockingham. It adjoins Port Kennedy which combines residential with retail and light-industrial land use. The suburb, which is named after Warnbro Sound, was gazetted on 5 April 1974.

The Vicinity Centres Warnbro Fair Shopping Centre includes Woolworths and Coles supermarkets together with a wide range of specialty retailers and fast-food outlets. The suburb has excellent sporting facilities including "Aqua Jetty", a multi-purpose recreation facility with Olympic-sized swimming pools and a large gymnasium. Secondary schools are the Warnbro Community High School which has about 1,600 students, and Living Waters Lutheran College, one of two Lutheran schools in Western Australia.

Notable residents
Warnbro is the home of the nineteenth Earl of Lincoln, who succeeded to the English title in 2001.
English-born Hollywood actor Sam Worthington grew up in Warnbro.

Public transport
Warnbro railway station on the Perth-Mandurah line is served by a network of feeder bus services which also link the suburb with Rockingham.

See also
 Electoral district of Warnbro

References

Suburbs of Perth, Western Australia
Suburbs in the City of Rockingham